The 2000 Sacramento State Hornets football team represented California State University, Sacramento as a member of the Big Sky Conference during the 2000 NCAA Division I-AA football season. Led by sixth-year head coach John Volek, Sacramento State compiled an overall record of 7–4 with a mark of 5–3 in conference play, placing in a four-way tie for second place in the Big Sky. They finished above .500 for the first time in Big Sky play. The team outscored its opponents 329 to 279 for the season. The Hornets played home games at Hornet Stadium in Sacramento, California.

Schedule

References

Sacramento State
Sacramento State Hornets football seasons
Sacramento State Hornets football